Lahad Datu is a state constituency in Sabah, Malaysia, that is represented in the Sabah State Legislative Assembly.

References 

Defunct Sabah state constituencies